Hasanpur Assembly constituency is an assembly constituency in Rosera Subdivision of Samastipur district in the Indian state of Bihar.

Overview
As per Delimitation of Parliamentary and Assembly constituencies Order, 2008, No. 140 Hasanpur Assembly constituency is composed of the following: Hasanpur and Bithan community development blocks; Kundal I, Kundal II,
Shalepur, Jahangirpur and Bishnupur Diha gram panchayats of Singhia CD Block.

Hasanpur Assembly constituency is part of No. 25 Khagaria (Lok Sabha constituency).

Hasanpur Railway Station is the biggest station in terms of passengers in Samastipur-Khagaria Line. It has fully computerised railway ticketing system. There are two main usable platforms. Third platform is used chiefly for goods trains.

Members of Legislative Assembly

Election Results

2020

References

External links
 

Assembly constituencies of Bihar
Politics of Samastipur district